Aruna Balaraj is an Indian actress in the Kannada film industry. Some of the films of Aruna Balraj as an actress include Naayi Neralu (2006), Ambari (2009), Raja Huli (2013) and Gubbi Mele Bramhastra (2019).

Career
Aruna Balraj has been a part of more than 100 films in Kannada.

Selected filmography
 Bisi Bisi (2004)
 Naayi Neralu (2006)
 Gaja (2008)
 Ambari (2009)...Saraswathi's mother
 Raja Huli (2013)...Rajahuli's mother
 Operation Alamelamma (2017)...Alamelamma
 Trunk (2018)
 Katheyondu Shuruvagide (2018)...Radha
 Vaasu Naan Pakka Commercial (2018)
 Ayogya (2018)...Bhagyamma
 Birbal Trilogy Case 1: Finding Vajramuni (2019)...Sumitra
 Lambodara (2019)
 Vishnu Circle (2019)
 Sinnga (2019)
 Gubbi Mele Brahmastra (2019)...Rukmini Gubbi
 Maduve Madri Sari Hogtane (2020)
 Yuvarathnaa (2021)
 Coffee with Kadhal (2022)
 Hosa Dinachari (2022)

Awards

See also

List of people from Karnataka
Cinema of Karnataka
List of Indian film actresses

References

External links

Actresses in Kannada cinema
Living people
Kannada people
Actresses from Karnataka
Indian film actresses
21st-century Indian actresses
Year of birth missing (living people)
Actresses in Telugu cinema